The 2005 IBF World Championships (World Badminton Championships) took place in Arrowhead Pond in Anaheim, United States, between August 15 and August 21, 2005. Following the results in the mixed doubles.

Seeds
 Nathan Robertson / Gail Emms, Second round
 Zhang Jun / Gao Ling, Quarter-final
 Chen Qiqiu / Zhao Tingting, Quarter-final
 Nova Widianto / Liliyana Natsir, Champions
 Jens Eriksen / Mette Schjoldager, Third round
 Lee Jae-jin / Lee Hyo-jung, Quarter-final
 Sudket Prapakamol / Saralee Thungthongkam, Semi-final
 Robert Blair / Natalie Munt, Third round
 Thomas Laybourn / Kamilla Rytter Juhl, Third round
 Koo Kien Keat / Wong Pei Tty, Third round
 Xie Zhongbo / Zhang Yawen, Runners-up
 Hendri Saputra / Li Yujia, Third round
 Anthony Clark / Donna Kellogg, Third round
 Fredrik Bergström / Johanna Persson, Quarter-final
 Daniel Shirley / Sara Runesten-Petersen, Semi-final
 Philippe Bourret / Helen Nichol, First round

Main stage

Section 1

Section 2

Section 3

Section 4

Final stage

External links 
2005 IBF results

Mixed doubles
World Championships